The 1907 Michigan State Normal Normalites football team represented Michigan State Normal College (later renamed Eastern Michigan University) during the 1907 college football season.  In their second season under head coach Henry Schulte, the Normalites compiled a record of 3–2, shut out three of five opponents, and outscored their opponents by a combined total of 72 to 13. The team defeated Central Michigan Normal School (later renamed Central Michigan University), 38–0. Ashley P. Merrill was the team captain.

Schedule

References

Michigan State Normal
Eastern Michigan Eagles football seasons
Michigan State Normal Normalites football